Brandon C. Jones (born August 23, 1977) is an American attorney and politician who served as a member of the Mississippi House of Representatives for the 111th district from 2008 to 2012.

Early life and education 
Jones was born in Pascagoula, Mississippi. He earned a Bachelor of Arts degree from Mississippi College, a Master of Divinity from Wake Forest University, and a Juris Doctor from the Mercer University School of Law.

Career 
Jones was elected to the Mississippi House of Representatives in 2008 and served until 2012. Jones was defeated for re-election by Charles Busby. From 2014 to 2021, Jones was an attorney at Baria-Jones, PLLC in Bay St. Louis, Mississippi. He joined the Southern Poverty Law Center in 2019 as Mississippi director and has worked as the organization's director of political campaigns since October 2021.

References 

Living people
People from Pascagoula, Mississippi
Members of the Mississippi House of Representatives
Mississippi lawyers
Mississippi College alumni
Wake Forest University alumni
Mercer University alumni
1977 births